The High Desert Discovery Scenic Byway is a  scenic highway in the southeastern part of the U.S. state of Oregon. It runs through the state's high desert country from the town of Burns to the unincorporated community of Fields. It was designated as an Oregon Scenic Byway in 2003. The highway is maintained by the Oregon Department of Transportation (ODOT). There are a number of points of interest along the route including several that are listed on the National Register of Historic Places.

Route description 

At the junction with Oregon Route 205, turn south onto the High Desert Discovery Scenic Byway. Continue south on Route 205 through the Malheur National Wildlife Refuge. The refuge extends from just south of the Narrows to the small unincorporated community of Frenchglen, Oregon.

The Steens Loop Tour Route begins at Frenchglen. From Frenchglen, the Discovery byway heads west and then southwest over a low pass into the Catlow Valley, west of Steens Mountain. Shortly after entering the valley, there is a turnoff for the Hart Mountain National Antelope Refuge to the west. However, the Discovery byway continues to follow Route 205. It passes by the Roaring Springs Ranch, running parallel with Catlow Rim just east of the highway. On its last leg, the byway passes over Long Hollow Summit and descends into the Pueblo Valley. The High Desert Discovery Scenic Byway ends at the small unincorporated community of Fields.

Alternate tour routes 

The Diamond Loop Tour Route and the Steens Loop Tour Route are side trips from the main byway. It is a  loop. The tour route offers the opportunity to see interesting geologic formations including the Diamond Craters volcanic area and the historic Pete French Round Barn. The Peter French barn is listed on the National Register of Historic Places. There is also a modern visitor center located at the barn site.

The Steens Loop Tour Route begins at Frenchglen. The route passes Kiger Gorge Overlook, a viewpoint above a deep U-shaped glacier cut valley. The route passes several other viewpoints along the crest of Steen Mountain as well. The tour provides an opportunity to spot Bighorn sheep on the mountain’s rocky cliffs. The Steen Mountain loop road is closed during the winter months.

Points of interest 

The goal of the Oregon state byway program is to preserve the state's most outstanding scenic highway corridors. It is also designed to provide interesting tourist opportunities for the traveling public. Oregon byways highlight the scenic, historic, recreational, and cultural features found along the routes. All of Oregon’s byways must met road standards that accommodate most travelers and are maintained by the Oregon Department of Transportation.

There are a number of interesting sights and places along the High Desert Discovery Scenic Byway route. These include:

 Harney Basin
 Wright Point
 Narrows interpretive site
 Buena Vista Station
 Malheur National Wildlife Refuge
 Diamond Loop Tour Route
 Frenchglen Hotel (listed on the National Register of Historic Places)
 P Ranch Historic District (listed on the National Register of Historic Places) 
 Steen Mountain Tour Route
 Catlow Valley
 Roaring Springs Ranch
 Catlow Rim
 Long Hollow Summit Viewpoint

In addition to the fixed points of interest, the High Desert Discovery Scenic Byway provides the opportunity to spot high desert wildlife along the route. A number of large mammal species inhabit the area along the byway and can sometime be seen from the roadway. These include pronghorn, mule deer, elk, and wild horses. Hawks and Golden eagles can be seen along the byway route as well. Sandhill cranes, Canada geese, tundra swans, and many species of ducks and shorebirds are common along the Malheur refuge section of the byway.

Byway highlights

History 

In 1991, the Intermodal Surface Transportation Efficiency Act established the National Scenic Byways Program. Congress put the Federal Highway Administration in charge of managing the program. The program is intends to promote economic development and tourism by protecting scenic highway routes, often in less-traveled areas of the country. To be designated as a scenic byway, the road must have unique natural, archaeological, cultural, historic, scenic, or recreational value.

In the early 1990s, the United States Fish and Wildlife Service and the Bureau of Land Management proposed a scenic byway between New Princeton and Lakeview. The proposed route ran through Malheur National Wildlife Refuge, Hart Mountain National Antelope Refuge, and Warner Wetlands. The plan included the construction of three visitor centers along the route plus 24 interpretive waysides. However, a national byway was never established.

In 2003, the state of Oregon designated a portion of Oregon Route 205 as the High Desert Discovery Scenic Byway. It was a shorter route than the one proposed by the United States Fish and Wildlife Service and the Bureau of Land Management, and did not include any visitor centers along the way. In addition to the main byway, the state also approved the Diamond Loop and Steens Loop scenic tour routes that year.

Major intersections

See also 

National Scenic Byway

References

External links 
Harney County, Oregon

2003 establishments in Oregon
Named state highways in Oregon
Scenic highways in Oregon
Transportation in Harney County, Oregon
Tourist attractions in Harney County, Oregon